Ardloughnabrackbaddy is a peak in County Donegal, Ireland, with a height of 603m.

Geography 
It sits above Loughnabrackbaddy (a lake) and is the middle summit and third highest of the "Seven Sisters". The Seven Sisters are part of the Derryveagh range and includes Muckish, Crocknalaragagh, Aghla Beg, Ardloughnabrackbaddy, Aghla More, Mackoght and Errigal.

Ardloughnabrackbaddy
Mountains under 1000 metres